Don't Mess With Mister T. is a Stanley Turrentine album produced by Creed Taylor on his label, CTI. It was arranged by Bob James and recorded at Van Gelder Studio in June 1973.

Reception
The Allmusic review by Ron Wynn awarded the album 4½ stars.

Track listing
 "Don't Mess With Mister T." (Marvin Gaye) – 9:51
 "Two for T." (Turrentine) – 7:06
 "Too Blue" (Turrentine) – 7:21
 "I Could Never Repay Your Love" (Bruce Hawes) – 8:22

Bonus tracks on CD reissue
"Pieces of Dreams" (Alan and Marilyn Bergman, Michel Legrand) - 7:28		
 "Don't Mess With Mister T." [Alternate Take] - 7:10
 "Mississippi City Strut" - 8:40
 "Harlem Dawn"	- 7:50

Personnel
 Stanley Turrentine - tenor saxophone
 Bob James - piano, electric piano, arranger, conductor
 Harold Mabern - electric piano
 Richard Tee - organ
 Idris Muhammad - drums
 Rubens Bassini - percussion
 Ron Carter - bass
 Eric Gale - guitar
 Randy Brecker - trumpet
 John Frosk - flugelhorn
 Alan Raph - bass trombone
 Pepper Adams - baritone saxophone
 Jerry Dodgion - alto saxophone
 Joe Farrell - tenor saxophone
 Harry Cykman, Harry Glickman, Emanuel Green, Harold Kohon, Guy Lumia, David Nadien, John Pintaualle, Irving Spice - violin
 Harold Coletta, Emanuel Vardi - viola
 Seymour Barab, George Ricci - cello

References

1973 albums
Stanley Turrentine albums
Albums produced by Creed Taylor
CTI Records albums
Albums recorded at Van Gelder Studio